Vittorio Francesco Viola O.F.M. (born 4 October 1965) is an Italian prelate of the Catholic Church who joined the Roman Curia in May 2021 as secretary of the Congregation for Divine Worship and the Discipline of the Sacraments with the rank of archbishop. A member of the Order of Friars Minor, he was bishop of Tortona from 2014 to 2021. His education specialized in liturgy; he has taught sacred liturgy at several institutions, managed the liturgy office of the Ecclesiastical Region of Umbria for almost two decades, and served as a member of the Italian Bishops Conference commission for liturgy.

Early years
Vittorio Francesco Viola was born on 4 October 1965 in Biella. He concentrated on science in high school and enrolled in university planning to study medicine, but after participating in Franciscan programs for young people he entered the Order of Friars Minor. He studied at the Theological Institute of Assisi and the Pontifical Institute of Sacred Liturgy in Rome, where he obtained his licentiate in liturgy. At the same university in 2000 he obtained his doctorate in sacred liturgy.

On 14 September 1991 he took his solemn vows in the Order of Friars Minor in Santa Maria degli Angeli. He was ordained as a deacon on 4 July 1992 and as a priest on 3 July 1993 by Luca Brandolini, Auxiliary Bishop of Rome.

After ordination, in the Order of Friars Minor he was definitor of the province of Umbria from 1999 to 2002, from 2003 to 2005, and from 2011 to 2014. He was Custodian of the Convent and the Papal Basilica of Santa Maria degli Angeli at the Porziuncola from 1999 to 2005 and Guardian of the Convent at the Basilica of Santa Chiara in Assisi from 2005 to 2014. At the diocesan level he was responsible for the liturgical office of the Ecclesiastical Region of Umbria from 1997 to 2014, for the education office of the Diocese of Assisi from 2006 to 2008 and then of the Caritas office of that diocese from 2008 to 2014. Because of his Caritas responsibilities, he helped organize and witnessed Pope Francis' lunch with the poor on his papal first visit to Assisi in October 2013, which Viola recalled was a surprising innovation at the time. He later told an interviewer that he developed his administrative skills at Caritas. In a message for Lent in 2014 he wrote: "When the data of the economic crisis, the percentages of unemployment, the options of immigration policies become names and faces, then we cannot fail to feel called to approach with the concrete service and with the charity of the proclamation of the Gospel because the preferential option for the poor must be translated above all into a favored and priority religious attention."

He has taught sacred liturgy at the Pontifical Institute of Sacred Liturgy, the Theological Institute of Assisi, and the Institute of Religious Sciences in Assisi.

Bishop
On 15 October 2014, Pope Francis appointed him bishop of Tortona. On 7 December he received his episcopal ordination in the Basilica of Santa Maria degli Angeli in Assisi from Domenico Sorrentino, archbishop of Assisi with Cardinal Gualtiero Bassetti, Archbishop of Perugia, and Bishop Martino Canessa, his predecessor in Tortona, as co-consecrators. As his episcopal motto he chose a Latin phrase from Saint Ambrose:  ("I discover you in your sacraments"). On 14 December he took possession of the diocese. When made a bishop he was the youngest Italian ordinary.

He was a member of the national commission for the liturgy within the Italian Episcopal Conference. As bishop, Viola said he tried to deepen the connections between liturgy and daily life: "They are not different things. The encounter with Christ that is fulfilled in fullness in the celebration of the sacraments is the same encounter with Christ that you live by welcoming your poor brother. It is always the same face of Christ that you meet."

Curial service
Viola had a private audience with Pope Francis on 14 January 2021. On 27 May 2021, Pope Francis appointed him secretary of the Congregation for Divine Worship and the Discipline of the Sacraments, raising him to the rank of archbishop and giving him the title Archbishop-Bishop Emeritus of Tortona. He became apostolic administrator of Tortona.

Honors
On 16 September 2017, Viola was made an honorary conventual chaplain of the Knights of Malta.

On 27 December 2017, he was made a commander of the Order of Merit of the Italian Republic.

Works

Notes

References

External links
  

Living people
1965 births
People from Biella
Liturgists
Officials of the Roman Curia
Franciscan bishops
21st-century Italian Roman Catholic archbishops
Commanders of the Order of Merit of the Italian Republic
Bishops appointed by Pope Francis